The chief passes of the Silvretta and Rhatikon Ranges, from the Fuela Pass to the Reschen Scheideck and the Arlberg Pass, are:

Note: road status .

See also
 List of highest paved roads in Europe
 List of mountain passes

References

Silvretta and Ratikon Ranges
Mountain passes of Graubünden